Zhangbei is a town in and the seat of government of Zhangbei County, Hebei, China. It served as the capital of the Imperial Japanese puppet state, Mengjiang from 1 September 1939–19 August 1945.

See also 
 List of township-level divisions of Hebei

Township-level divisions of Hebei
Zhangjiakou